Goh Hup Jin (吳學人, born 1952/1953) is a Singaporean businessman, and the chairman of Nippon Paint since March 2018.

Early life
Goh Hup Jin is the son of Goh Cheng Liang, a Singaporean billionaire.

Goh earned a bachelor's degree in engineering from Tokyo University, and an MBA from the University of California.

Career
Goh has been the chairman of Nippon Paint since March 2018, and runs the family's privately held joint venture, Nipsea.

Personal life
Goh owns a house in Singapore's Queen Astrid Park district, which he bought for US$44.5 million in July 2016.

References

Living people
Singaporean businesspeople
Singaporean people of Chinese descent
1950s births
Tokyo University of Science alumni
University of California alumni
Singaporean people of Teochew descent